The ceremony for the 29th Hong Kong Film Awards took place on 18 April 2010.

Wang Po-chieh's original nomination for the Best New Performer was withdrawn after he was confirmed to be an actor in the 2008 Taiwan film Winds of September. His nomination was replaced by Fala Chen.

Awards
Winners are listed first, highlighted in boldface, and indicated with a double dagger.

References

External links
 Official website of the Hong Kong Film Awards

2010
2009 film awards
2010 in Hong Kong
Hong